Peter Henry Andrews Sneath FRS, MD (17 November 1923 – September 9, 2011) was a microbiologist who co-founded the field of numerical taxonomy, together with Robert R. Sokal. Sneath and Sokal wrote Principles of Numerical Taxonomy, revised in 1973 as Numerical Taxonomy. Sneath reviewed the state of numerical taxonomy in 1995 and wrote some autobiographical notes in 2010.

A special issue of the journal Antonie van Leeuwenhoek, on microbial systematics, is dedicated to the memory of Peter Sneath.

References

External links
Peter H. A. Sneath (1923 - 2011)

1923 births
2011 deaths
British microbiologists
Fellows of the Royal Society
Place of birth missing
British taxonomists